Myrvold is a surname. Notable people with this name include:

 Anders Myrvold (born 1975), Norwegian ice hockey player
 Lasse Myrvold (1953–2006), Norwegian musician and composer
 Pia Myrvold, Norwegian designer of interactive art installations
 Wendy Myrvold, Canadian mathematician and computer scientist